The meridian 105° west of Greenwich is a line of longitude that extends from the North Pole across the Arctic Ocean, North America, the Pacific Ocean, the Southern Ocean, and Antarctica to the South Pole.

The 105th meridian west forms a great circle with the 75th meridian east.

It serves as the reference meridian for the seventh time zone west of Greenwich, known as UTC-07 or the Mountain Time Zone in North America.

In the United States, Interstate Highway I-25 roughly parallels the meridian from Douglas, Wyoming to Las Vegas, New Mexico, and from Wellington, Colorado to the Prospect Road interchange (in Fort Collins, Colorado), I-25 happens to be almost exactly aligned along the 105th meridian west.  The meridian bisects Denver, Colorado, passing through Denver Union Station.  Throughout the Denver metro area, Kalamath Street is the road that most closely corresponds to the 105th meridian.

From Pole to Pole
Starting at the North Pole and heading south to the South Pole, the 105th meridian west passes through:

{| class="wikitable plainrowheaders"
! scope="col" width="130" | Co-ordinates
! scope="col" | Country, territory or sea
! scope="col" | Notes
|-
| style="background:#b0e0e6;" | 
! scope="row" style="background:#b0e0e6;" | Arctic Ocean
| style="background:#b0e0e6;" |
|-
| 
! scope="row" | 
| Nunavut — Ellef Ringnes Island
|-
| style="background:#b0e0e6;" | 
! scope="row" style="background:#b0e0e6;" | Arctic Ocean
| style="background:#b0e0e6;" |
|-
| 
! scope="row" | 
| Nunavut — Ellef Ringnes Island
|-
| style="background:#b0e0e6;" | 
! scope="row" style="background:#b0e0e6;" | Maclean Strait
| style="background:#b0e0e6;" |
|-
| 
! scope="row" | 
| Nunavut — Lougheed Island
|-
| style="background:#b0e0e6;" | 
! scope="row" style="background:#b0e0e6;" | Byam Martin Channel
| style="background:#b0e0e6;" |
|-
| style="background:#b0e0e6;" | 
! scope="row" style="background:#b0e0e6;" | Byam Channel
| style="background:#b0e0e6;" | Passing just west of Byam Martin Island, Nunavut,  (at )
|-
| style="background:#b0e0e6;" | 
! scope="row" style="background:#b0e0e6;" | Parry Channel
| style="background:#b0e0e6;" | Viscount Melville Sound
|-
| 
! scope="row" | 
| Nunavut — Stefansson Island
|-
| style="background:#b0e0e6;" | 
! scope="row" style="background:#b0e0e6;" | M'Clintock Channel
| style="background:#b0e0e6;" |
|-
| 
! scope="row" | 
| Nunavut — Victoria Island
|-
| style="background:#b0e0e6;" | 
! scope="row" style="background:#b0e0e6;" | Queen Maud Gulf
| style="background:#b0e0e6;" |
|-
| 
! scope="row" | 
| Nunavut — Melbourne Island and the mainland Northwest Territories — from  Saskatchewan — from 
|-valign="top"
| 
! scope="row" | 
|-valign="top"
| 
! scope="row" | 
| Chihuahua Durango — from  Nayarit — from  Jalisco — from 
|-
| style="background:#b0e0e6;" | 
! scope="row" style="background:#b0e0e6;" | Pacific Ocean
| style="background:#b0e0e6;" | Passing just east of Isla Salas y Gómez,  (at )
|-
| style="background:#b0e0e6;" | 
! scope="row" style="background:#b0e0e6;" | Southern Ocean
| style="background:#b0e0e6;" |
|-
| 
! scope="row" | Antarctica
| Unclaimed territory
|-
|}

See also
104th meridian west
106th meridian west

w105 meridian west